Fandemonium is one of southwest Idaho's sci-fi, anime, and gaming conventions, created to bring multi-genre conventions to Idaho. Held annually in Nampa, Idaho at the Nampa Civic Center, the convention takes place during the first full weekend of August. The convention has featured role-playing games such as Dungeons and Dragons and HârnMaster, cosplay groups and competitive contests for costume designs, collectible card games like Magic, the Gathering, computer games, and more.

Events
Events held at the convention are produced by the attendees at the event. Attendees create events by requesting space and time slots months before the convention, and then they are given a space to run their panel, event, competition, and other activities.
 Cosplay and costume contests are common as photographers attend to take action shots and different cosplay group photos for their organizations.
 Dances and mini-events occur often at the will of the Random Games Staff at Fandemonium, where they have been known to throw in different events for audience pleasure.
 Stage performers and cosplay groups create productions just for Fandemonium each year and perform for audiences on stage.
 Concerts where local bands can come out and play for the attendees during the evenings.
 One of the largest boffer sword melees in the Treasure Valley occur at Fandemonium each year, as the Convention Chairman, Borneo, produces a class on creation and use of boffer swords and then holds a contest with anyone with safe weapons.

Timeline

Notes

External links 
Fandemonium.org

Defunct multigenre conventions
August events
Defunct gaming conventions
Conventions in Idaho